is a Japanese football player who plays for Omiya Ardija.

Club statistics
Updated to 23 February 2018.

References

External links

Profile at Omiya Ardija

1985 births
Living people
Association football people from Kyoto Prefecture
Japanese footballers
J1 League players
J2 League players
Vissel Kobe players
Omiya Ardija players
Association football defenders